Brussels Agreement may refer to:

Brussels Agreement (1924), a multilateral treaty providing for the medical treatment of seamen with venereal diseases
Brussels Agreement (1984), a treaty between Spain and the United Kingdom respecting Gibraltar
Brussels Agreement (2013), normalising relations between Serbia and Kosovo

See also
Treaty of Brussels